Glasgow Girls & Women Football Club, whose first team is branded as Glasgow Women F.C., is a Scottish women's association football club based in the East End of Glasgow. They are members of the Scottish Women's Premier League (SWPL), the highest level women's football league in Scotland, and compete in its top tier, SWPL 1. They were previously known as Glasgow Girls F.C. at senior level before rebranding in 2020 as Glasgow Women.

History
The club was formed in 2008, following on from an earlier club called Clyde Girls. They initially operated at under-13 level, subsequently adding other age level teams and an adult team. Several of the original group of girls progressed to the senior team. An associated boys' club, Glasgow Boys, was founded in 2013.

The club has been awarded the SFA Legacy Quality Mark, the national body's highest accreditation for organising football to a recognised standard.

Ground
Until 2017 the club played its home games at Budhill Park in the Springboig area of Glasgow, which opened in 2013. From 2018, the senior team played some of their home games at Petershill Park in the north of the city (also the home ground of multiple Scottish champions Glasgow City) and some at the Greenfield Football Centre near Carntyne. In 2022–23, home fixtures were played at New Tinto Park in Govan, home of Benburb.

Players

Current squad

References

External links

Women's football clubs in Scotland
Football clubs in Glasgow
Scottish Women's Premier League clubs
Association football clubs established in 2008
2008 establishments in Scotland